was a Japanese serial killer who murdered four young girls in Tokyo and Saitama Prefecture between August 1988 and June 1989. He abducted and killed the girls, aged from 4 to 7, in his car before dismembering them and molesting their corpses. He also engaged in cannibalism, preserved body parts as trophies, and taunted the families of his victims.

Miyazaki was arrested in Hachiōji in July 1989 after being confronted while taking nude photographs of a young girl. He was diagnosed as having one or more personality disorders, but was determined by authorities to be sane and aware of his crimes and their consequences. Miyazaki was sentenced to death in 1997 and was executed by hanging in 2008.

Miyazaki was dubbed the "Otaku Murderer" due to his extensive collection of pornography and horror videotapes, which was misrepresented by the media as being primarily anime and manga. This triggered a widespread moral panic against otaku in Japan.

Early life
Tsutomu Miyazaki was born on 21 August 1962 in Itsukaichi, Tokyo, the eldest son of a wealthy family. He was born premature and had a rare birth defect that caused his hand joints to be fused together, preventing him from being able to bend his wrists upwards. Miyazaki's family operated a regional newspaper company and were well known in Itsukaichi, where his grandfather and great-grandfather had served on the town council. Due to his parents being busy, he was mainly raised by his grandfather and an intellectually disabled man the family hired as a nanny.

Miyazaki was ostracized when he attended elementary school due to his deformity, and consequently kept to himself. He attended Meidai Nakano High School in Nakano, a prestigious high school associated with Meiji University, and was a star student until his grades began to drop dramatically. He was ranked 40 out of 56 in his class and did not receive the customary admission to Meiji University for students of the school. Instead of studying English and becoming a teacher as he originally intended, Miyazaki attended a local junior college and studied to become a photography technician.

In the mid-1980s, Miyazaki moved back into his parents' house in Itsukaichi, sharing a room with his elder sister. Although his family was highly influential in Itsukaichi, he expressed no desire to take over their business. After his arrest, Miyazaki would say that what he really craved was "being listened to about his problems" but believed that his parents, more worried about the material than the sentimental, "would have not heard [him]; [he] would've been ignored". In the same confession, he said that by this period in his life he had begun to consider suicide. Miyazaki felt he only received support from his grandfather, to whom he was close, and was rejected by his two younger sisters.

In May 1988, Miyazaki's grandfather died, which served to deepen his depression and isolate him even further. In an attempt to "retain something from him", Miyazaki ate part of his grandfather's ashes. A few weeks later, one of Miyazaki's sisters caught him watching her while she was taking a shower; he attacked her when she told him to leave. When his mother learned of the incident and demanded that he spend more time working and less time with his videotapes, he attacked her as well.

Murders
Between August 1988 and June 1989, Miyazaki mutilated and murdered four girls between the ages of 4 and 7, and sexually molested their corpses. He drank the blood of one victim and ate a part of her hand. These crimes—which prior to Miyazaki's apprehension were named the "Little Girl Murders" and later the —shocked Saitama Prefecture, which had few crimes against children.

On 22 August 1988, one day after Miyazaki's 26th birthday, Mari Konno, aged 4, vanished while playing at a friend's house. Miyazaki had led Konno into his black Nissan Langley, then drove westward of Tokyo and parked the car under a bridge in a wooded area. There, he sat alongside Konno for half an hour before murdering her and molesting her corpse. He dumped her body in the hills near his home, departing with her clothes, then allowed the body to decompose before returning to remove her hands and feet, which he kept in his closet. Miyazaki burned Konno's remaining bones in his furnace, ground them into powder, and sent them to her family in a box along with several of her teeth, photos of her clothes, and a postcard which read,  ("Mari. Bones. Cremated. Investigate. Prove.") Konno's hands and feet were found in Miyazaki's closet after his arrest almost a year later.

On 3 October 1988, Miyazaki abducted Masami Yoshizawa, aged 7, after spotting her while driving along a rural road. He had offered Yoshizawa a ride, which she accepted, then drove her to the same place he had killed Konno. Miyazaki killed Yoshizawa, engaged in sexual acts with her corpse, and took her clothes with him when he departed. Two months later, on 12 December 1988, he abducted Erika Namba, aged 4, as she was returning home from a friend's house. Miyazaki forced her into his car and drove to a parking lot in Naguri, where he forced her to remove her clothes in the back seat and began to take pictures of her. He killed Namba, tied her hands and feet behind her back, covered her with a bedsheet, and placed her body in his car's trunk. He disposed of her clothes in a wooded area and left her body in the adjoining parking lot, where it was discovered three days later. On 20 December, Namba's family received a postcard sent by Miyazaki with a message assembled using words cut out of magazines:  ("Erika. Cold. Cough. Throat. Rest. Death.")

On 6 June 1989, Miyazaki convinced Ayako Nomoto, aged 5, to allow him to take pictures of her. He then led Nomoto into his car and murdered her, covered her corpse with a bedsheet and placed her in his trunk. Miyazaki took the corpse into his apartment and spent the next two days engaging in sexual acts with it, taking photos and video of the remains in various positions. When Nomoto's corpse began to decompose, Miyazaki dismembered it, abandoning her torso in a cemetery and her head in the nearby hills. He kept her hands, drinking blood from and cannibalizing them. Fearing that the police would find Nomoto's body parts, Miyazaki returned to the cemetery and the hills two weeks later and carried the remains back to his apartment, where he hid them in his closet.

Arrest
On 23 July 1989, Miyazaki saw two sisters playing in a park in Hachiōji and managed to separate the younger of the sisters from the older one, who stayed behind. He was taking photographs of the younger daughter, whom he had convinced to strip nude, when he was caught by their father, who attacked Miyazaki but was unable to restrain him. After fleeing on foot, Miyazaki eventually returned to the park to retrieve his car, whereupon he was arrested by police responding to a call by the father. A search of his two-room bungalow produced 5,763 videotapes, some containing anime and slasher films (later used as reasoning for his crimes). Interspersed among them was video footage and photos of his victims. Miyazaki, who retained a perpetually calm and collected demeanor during his trial, appeared indifferent to his capture.

Moral panic
Japanese media dubbed Miyazaki the "Otaku Murderer", in reference to otaku culture. His killings caused a moral panic against otaku, with speculation that anime and horror films had made him a murderer. Various newspapers claimed that Miyazaki had retreated into a fantasy world of manga as a result of his neglected upbringing.
Keigo Okonogi, a psychoanalyst at Tokyo International University, told the Shūkan Post that:

These reports were disputed. In Eiji Ōtsuka's book on Miyazaki's crimes, he argued that Miyazaki's collection of pornography was probably added or amended by a photographer in order to highlight his perversity. Another critic, Fumiya Ichihashi, suspected the released information played up to public stereotypes and fears about otaku, as the police knew they would help cement a conviction. Sharon Kinsella asserts that large collections of manga and videos were typical in the rooms of youths living in the Tokyo area at the time.

Trial and execution
Miyazaki's trial began on 30 March 1990. Often talking nonsensically, he blamed his actions on "Rat Man", an alter ego who he claimed forced him to kill; he spent time during the trial drawing "Rat Man" in cartoon form. Miyazaki's father refused to pay for his son's legal defense and died by suicide in 1994.

The seven-year trial focused on Miyazaki's mental state at the time of the murders. Under Japanese law, people of unsound minds are not subject to punishment, and people having cognitive disability are entitled to reduced sentences. Three teams of court-appointed expert psychiatrists came to differing conclusions about Miyazaki's ability to tell right from wrong. One team determined him to have a cognitive disability while another team concluded that he was schizophrenic, the other that he had multiple personality disorder. A third team found that although Miyazaki had a personality disorder, he was still capable of taking responsibility for his actions.

The Tokyo District Court judged Miyazaki aware of the magnitude and consequences of his crimes and therefore accountable. He was sentenced to death on April 14, 1997. His death sentence was upheld by both the Tokyo High Court, on June 28, 2001, and the Supreme Court of Justice on January 17, 2006.

Miyazaki described his serial murders as an "act of benevolence". Child killer Kaoru Kobayashi described himself as "the next Tsutomu Miyazaki or Mamoru Takuma", to which Miyazaki stated, "I won't allow him to call himself 'the second Tsutomu Miyazaki' when he hasn't even undergone a psychiatric examination."

Minister of Justice Kunio Hatoyama signed Miyazaki's death warrant on June 17, 2008, and he was hanged at the Tokyo Detention House that same day. Ryūzō Saki said, "His trial was long" and that he was "not willing to criticize Hatoyama".

Victims
: four years old, 22 August 1988
: seven years old, 3 October 1988
: four years old, 12 December 1988
: five years old, 6 June 1989

See also
Norio Nagayama
Insanity defense
List of executions in Japan
List of serial killers by country

References

1962 births
2008 deaths
1988 murders in Asia
1989 murders in Asia
21st-century executions by Japan
Executed Japanese serial killers
Human trophy collecting
Japanese cannibals
Japanese murderers of children
Japanese people convicted of child sexual abuse
Japanese people convicted of murder
Japanese people with disabilities
Male serial killers
Necrophiles
Otaku
People convicted of murder by Japan
People executed by Japan by hanging
People from Western Tokyo
People with personality disorders
People with schizophrenia
Vampirism (crime)